The 12903 / 12904 Golden Temple Mail is a Mail train belonging to Indian Railways that runs daily between  (MMCT) in Maharashtra and  (ASR) in Punjab. It is named after the famous Golden Temple at Amritsar. The train is running with modern LHB coaches from 29 September 2020. The train ran as the Frontier Mail between 1928 and 1996, ferrying passengers arriving by Steamer from Europe directly from Ballard Pier in Bombay to the city of Peshawar on India's North-West Frontier before the Partition of India.

It operates as train number 12903 from Mumbai Central to Amritsar Junction and as train number 12904 in the reverse direction.

History
The Golden Temple Mail was until September 1996 known as Frontier Mail.  Prior the Partition of India, it would run up to Peshawar on India's frontier with Afghanistan from which it derived its name. During the autumn months between September and December, the train used to depart from the  station. This was for the convenience of the British who arrived in India by steamer. The Frontier Mail also finds a place in romanticised biographies of film actor Prithviraj Kapoor who is believed to have travelled to Bombay from his hometown of Peshawar by the Frontier Mail in 1928 to act in films. Hunterwali, probably India's first action heroine, has acted in the film Miss Frontier Mail. The Frontier Mail was the first air conditioned train in the Indian Peninsula, when it got an air-conditioned compartment in 1934. The radio facility was provided for the first time in the Golden Temple Mail.

Coaches

The 12903/04 Golden Temple Mail has 1 AC First cum AC 2 Tier, 2 AC 2 tier, 5 AC 3 tier, 8 Sleeper class, 2 General unreserved coaches, 2 General cum baggage coaches. It also has 1 Railway Mail service coach, 1 Pantry car & 1 High Capacity Parcel Van.

Service

The Golden Temple Mail runs between Mumbai Central and Amritsar Junction. It is a daily service covering the distance of 1891 km in 32 hours 15 minutes as 12903 Golden Temple Mail averaging 58.64 km/hr & 31 hours 55 minutes as 12904 Golden Temple Mail averaging 59.25 km/hr.

Accident
The Down Frontier Mail, from Bombay side, with a load of 13 coaches, entered Fateh Singhpura Station on the loop line which was already occupied by No. 1118 up goods train, and collided with it The two coaches next to the engine of the Frontier Mail remained on the line undamaged, the third, a II class bogie coach, derailed, and the fourth, also a II class bogie coach, telescoped into the former. The fifth coach remained on the line but was slightly damaged, and the remaining 8 coaches remained on the line undamaged. The engines of the two trains and goods wagons are reported to have suffered hardly any damage. One, Shri Shiv Charan Singh, retired Principal of Government College, Rupar, a II class passenger in the third coach, unfortunately died, and thirty-four other passengers holding different classes of tickets received minor injuries.

Traction

It is now regularly hauled by a Vadodara Loco Shed based WAP-7 locomotive from end to end.

Route and halts

Gallery

Notes

References

External links
 About this train
 Golden Temple Mail
 Accident this train page no.50 
 Golden Temple Mail Route Map
 
 Locomotive link

Transport in Mumbai
Transport in Amritsar
Railway services introduced in 1928
Rail transport in Punjab, India
Rail transport in Madhya Pradesh
Rail transport in Haryana
Rail transport in Rajasthan
Rail transport in Delhi
Rail transport in Maharashtra
Rail transport in Gujarat
Rail transport in Uttar Pradesh
Mail trains in India